This is a list of classical repertoire for two violins – either unaccompanied, with orchestra, or with piano.

Two solo violins
 Kalevi Aho: Lamento (2001)
 Gilbert Amy: 6 Duos (2002)
 Julian Anderson: Ring Dance (1987)
 Christian Asplund:
Choreutics
One Eternal Round
Neuf Regards
Hope #4
 Milton Babbitt: Arrivals and Departures (1994)
 Béla Bartók: 44 Duos, Sz. 98, BB 104 (1931)
 Luciano Berio: Duetti (1983)
 Charles Auguste de Bériot:
3 Grandi Studi, Op. 43 (1843)
3 Duos concertants, Op. 57 (1847)
12 Petits duos faciles, Op. 87 (1853)
6 Duos caractéristiques, Op. 113 (1863)
 Luigi Boccherini: 6 Duos, Op. 3 (1761)
 Gavin Bryars: Die letzten Tage (1992)
 Howard J. Buss: Time Capsule (2002)
 Unsuk Chin: Gran Cadenza (2018)
 Peter Maxwell Davies: A Little Thank You to Dave (2005)
 Edison Denisov: Sonata (1958) 
 Franco Donatoni: Duet No. 2 (1995)
 Josef Bohuslav Foerster: Little Suite, Op. 183a (1944)
 Géza Frid:
 Twenty Duos, Op. 37
 Paganini Variations for two violin ensembles or two violins, Op. 77
 Robert Fuchs:
 20 Duos, Op. 55 (1896)
 Phantasiestücke, 16 Duos, Op. 105 (1915)
 Reinhold Glière: 12 Duos, Op. 49 (1909)
 Vladimír Godár: Violin Duets, 72 pieces for two violins (1981) - I. 24 Duets; II. 40 Duets (Melodiarium); III. Suite for Two Violins
 Henryk Górecki: Sonata for Two Violins, Op. 10 (1961)
 Georg Friedrich Haas: Fuga (2009)
 Alois Hába: Duo for 6th-tone violins, Op. 49 (1937)
 Johan Halvorsen: Concert Caprice over Norwegian Melodies [Norwegian Rhapsody] for two Violins (composed 1894, printed posth. 1946)
 John Harbison: Fanfares and Reflection (1990)
 Joseph Haydn:
 6 Sonatas, Op. 6 (1796)
 Duo, Hob.VI:C2, C3, D4, F3, G3, G4, A2
 Swan Hennessy: Sonatina, Op. 78 (c.1928–29)
 Paul Hindemith:
Kanonische Variationen (1931)
14 leichte Stücke (1931)
 Vagn Holmboe: Sværm, Op. 190a (1992)
 Arthur Honegger: Sonatine (1920)
 Nigel Keay: Two-Step Distance (2020)
 Drago Kocakov: Intimus (1951)
 György Kurtág: Triptic, Op. 45 (2007)
 Jean-Marie Leclair
 6 Sonatas, Op.3 (1730)
 6 Sonatas, Op.12 (1747)
 György Ligeti: Baladă şi joc (1950)
 Alvin Lucier: Love Song, for two violinists whose instruments are connected by a cable attached to the bridge (2016)
 Darius Milhaud:
 Sonatina, Op. 221 (1940)
 Duo, Op. 258 (1945)
 Carl Nielsen: Violin Duet, CNW 48
 Luigi Nono: Hay que caminar, soñando (1989)
 Michael Nyman: Two Violins, for two amplified violins (1981)
 Allan Pettersson: Seven sonatas (1951)
 Ignaz Pleyel:
 Duos for 2 violins (2 flutes or violin, flute), B.507-512 (1788)
 Violin duos, B.513-524 (1789), B.534A-537 (1799), 538-543 (1806)
 Gerhard Präsent: 
 Vier Tänze für zwei Violinen (Four Dances for Two Violins), Op. 24 
 Easy Duos, Op. 56
 Green Music, Op. 72
 Sergei Prokofiev: Sonata for two violins in C, Op. 56 (1932)
 Marta Ptaszynska: Mancala (1997)
 Osmo Tapio Räihälä: Rampant (1997)
 Tomi Räisänen:
Midsommar(so)natten (2010/2014)
No-Go (2011/2016)
Kiseki-no-ippon-matsu (2020)
 Behzad Ranjbaran: Six Caprices for Violin Duo (1988)
 Alan Rawsthorne: Theme and Variations (1937/38)
 Max Reger: Drei Canons und Fugen im alten Stil, Op. 131b (1914)
 Kaija Saariaho: Danse des flocons, I and II (2002)
 Giacinto Scelsi: Arc-en-ciel (1973)
 Alfred Schnittke: Prelude in Memoriam Dmitri Shostakovich (1975)
 Franz Schubert: 4 komische Ländler, D 354 (1816)
 Ferenc Sebök: 6 duos for violins, Op. 6
 Miroirs de styles, 24 duos for violins, Op. 4, 5, 8, 20
 Johanna Senfter: 10 Alte Tänze, Op. 91 
 Louis Spohr:
 3 Concertant Duos, Op. 3
 2 Concertant Duos, Op. 9
 3 Grand Duos, Op. 39
 3 Concertant Duos, Op. 67
 Grand Duo, Op. 148 (1856)
 Duo, Op. 150 (1856)
 Duo, Op. 153 (1856)
 Anton Stamitz:
 6 Violin Duos, Op.8
 6 Violin Duos, Op.9
 Carl Stamitz: 6 Duos for 2 flutes or violins, Op.27
 Toru Takemitsu: Rocking Mirror Daybreak (1983)
 Georg Philipp Telemann:
6 Sonates sans Basse for two traversos, violins or recorders, TWV 40:101-106 (1728-29)
Gulliver's Travels, Intrada-Suite, TWV 40:108 (1728-29)
18 Canons Mélodieux for two traversos, violins or viola da gambas, TWV 40:118-123 (1738)
Second Livre de Duo, 6 Sonatas for two violins, flutes or oboes, TWV 40:124-129 (1752)
 Mikis Theodorakis:
 Études (1945)
 Duetto (1946)
Winternacht (2005) 
 Giovanni Battista Viotti:
 6 Violin Duos, Op. 5 (1797-98)
 3 Violin Duos, Op. 18 (1803)
 6 Duo Serenatas, Op. 23 (1804)
 6 Violin Duos, WIV:1-6 (1789)
 6 Concertant Duos, WIV:7-12 (1789-90)
 6 Easy Duos, WIV:13-18 (1796)
 3 Violin Duos, WIV:28-30 (1803)
 Antonín Vranický: 
 Variations, Op. 7 (1807)
 Duos, Op. 9 (1804)
 Three Duos, Op. 20
 Twenty variations (1791)
 Johann Baptist Wanhal
 16 Violin Duets, Op.17
 6 Violin Duets, Op.28
 24 Violin Duets, Op.56 
 Mieczysław Weinberg: Sonata, Op. 69 (1959)
 Henryk Wieniawski: Études-Caprices, Op. 18 (1862)
 Christian Wolff: Duo for violins (1950)
 Eugène Ysaÿe: Duo Sonata (1915)
 Isang Yun:
 Sonatina (1983)
 Pezzo fantasioso per due instrumenti con basso ad libitum (1988)
 John Zorn: Apophthegms (2012)

Two violins and orchestra
 Malcolm Arnold: Concerto for 2 Violins and String Orchestra, Op. 77
 Johann Sebastian Bach: Concerto for 2 Violins in D minor, BWV 1043
 P. D. Q. Bach: Konzertstück for Two Violins with Orchestra, S. 2+ † 
 Anna Clyne: Prince of Clouds for two violins and string orchestra (2012)
 Gerd Domhardt: Concerto for 2 violins and orchestra in one movement (1979)
 Rob du Bois: Concerto for 2 violins and orchestra (1979)
 Lukas Foss: Orpheus and Euridice for 2 violins, chamber orchestra and tape (1983); 2nd version of Orpheus (1972)
 Géza Frid:
 Concerto for 2 violins and orchestra, Op. 40 
 Concerto for Three violins and orchestra, Op. 78 
 Philip Glass: Echorus for 2 violins and string orchestra (1995, version of the Etude No. 2 for piano) 
 Gustav Holst: Double Concerto for 2 violins and orchestra, Op. 49
 Bohuslav Martinů: 
 Duo Concertante (Concerto No. 1) for 2 violins and orchestra, H. 264
 Concerto No. 2 in D major for 2 violins and orchestra, H. 329
 Karl Marx: Concerto for 2 violins and orchestra
 Wolfgang Amadeus Mozart: Concertone in C major for 2 violins and orchestra, K. 190
 Mark O'Connor: Double Violin Concerto for 2 violins and symphony orchestra
 Arvo Pärt: Tabula Rasa for 2 violins, prepared piano and string orchestra
 Marta Ptaszynska: Concerto Grosso for 2 violins and chamber orchestra (1996.)
 Steve Reich: Duet for 2 Violins and string ensemble (1994) 
 Pablo de Sarasate: Navarra, Duo in A major for 2 violins and orchestra (or piano), Op. 33 (1889.)
 Johanna Senfter: Concerto for 2 violins and string orchestra, Op. 40 
 Obadiah Shuttleworth: 2 concerti grossi, for two solo violins and string orchestra, arranged from the opus 5 solo sonatas by Arcangelo Corelli (1653–1713)
 Nikos Skalkottas: Concerto for 2 violins (1944–5) (not orchestrated)
 Antonio Vivaldi: Concerto for 2 violins in A minor, RV522
 Eugène Ysaÿe: Amitié, poem for 2 violins and orchestra, Op. 26

Two violins and piano
 Géza Frid: Separate Ways, Op. 75a 
 Vagn Holmboe: Isomeric, Duo Concertante, Op. 51 (1950)
 Darius Milhaud: Sonata for Two Violins and Piano, Op. 15
 Dmitri Shostakovich: Five pieces for 2 Violins and Piano
 Moritz Moszkowski: Suite, Op. 71
 Christian Sinding: 
 Serenade, Op. 56/1 
 Serenade, Op. 92/2
 Ladislav Gabrielli: Three trios for two violins and piano

 
 
 
Violins, two
Violins